Ziethen may refer to:

places in Germany
Ziethen, Brandenburg, in the district of Barnim, Brandenburg
Ziethen, Mecklenburg-Vorpommern, in the district of Vorpommern-Greifswald, Mecklenburg-Vorpommern
Ziethen, Schleswig-Holstein, in the district of Lauenburg, Schleswig-Holstein

See also 
Zieten (disambiguation)